Kenneth T. Gagnon is an American politician from Maine. Gagnon served as a Democratic State Senator from Maine's 25th District, representing much of Kennebec County, including population centers of Waterville and Winslow as well as two communities in Somerset County. He was first elected to the Maine State Senate in 2000. He also previously served in the Maine House of Representatives from 1996 to 2000 before being elected to the Senate. He also served on the Waterville City Council.

From 2004 to 2006, Gagnon served as Senate Majority Leader.

Personal
Gagnon studied at Hamline University. He worked at Colby College.

References

Year of birth missing (living people)
Living people
Democratic Party Maine state senators
Politicians from Waterville, Maine
Colby College people
Democratic Party members of the Maine House of Representatives
Maine city council members
21st-century American politicians